Jay Clayton may refer to:

Jay Clayton (attorney), SEC chairman under Donald Trump
Jay Clayton (critic) (born 1951), American literary critic
Jay Clayton (musician) (born 1941), American jazz vocalist and educator